The 2007 Zenit St.Petersburg season was the club's thirteenth season in the Russian Premier League, the highest tier of association football in Russia. Zenit won the Russian Premier League for the first time in their history, whilst reaching the Quarterfinal of both the 2006–07 and 2007–08 Russian Cups. In Europe, Zenit entered the UEFA Cup at the first round stage, before finishing third in their group, advancing to the Round of 32 which would take place during their 2008 season.

Squad

Out on loan

Transfers

In

Out

Loans out

Released

Competitions

Overall record

Premier League

Results by round

Results

League table

Russian Cup

2006–07

2007–08

UEFA Cup

2007–08

First round

Group stage

Squad statistics

Appearances and goals

|-
|colspan="14"|Players away from the club on loan:
|-
|colspan="14"|Players who left Zenit St.Petersburg during the season:
|}

Goal scorers

Clean sheets

Disciplinary record

References

2007
Zenit Saint Petersburg
Russian football championship-winning seasons